Visa requirements for Equatorial Guinean citizens are administrative entry restrictions by the authorities of other states placed on citizens of the Equatorial Guinea. As of 2 July 2019, Equatorial Guinean citizens had visa-free or visa on arrival access to 50 countries and territories, ranking the Equatorial Guinean passport 93rd in terms of travel freedom (tied with passports from Cambodia and Turkmenistan) according to the Henley Passport Index.

Visa requirements map

Visa requirements

Dependent, Disputed, or Restricted territories
Unrecognized or partially recognized countries

Dependent and autonomous territories

See also
Visa policy of Equatorial Guinea

References and Notes
References

Notes

Equatorial Guinea
Foreign relations of Equatorial Guinea